SM UB-42 was a Type UB II submarine or U-boat for the German Imperial Navy during World War I. UB-42 operated in the Mediterranean and the Black Seas during the war. She was broken up at Malta in 1920.

UB-42 was ordered in July 1915 and was laid down at the AG Weser shipyard in Bremen in September. She was equipped to carry a complement of four torpedoes for her two bow torpedo tubes and had an  deck gun. As part of a group of six submarines selected for Mediterranean service, UB-42 was broken into railcar sized components and shipped to Pola where she was assembled, launched and commissioned in March 1916.

In October 1916, UB-42 delivered five Georgians who had gold to help finance a Georgian independence movement. After the surrender of the Ottoman Empire in late October 1918, UB-42 fled to Sevastopol, where she was surrendered in November. UB-42 was taken to Malta, where she was broken up in 1920.

Design and construction 
The German UB II design improved upon the design of the UB I boats, which had been ordered in September 1914. In service, the UB I boats were found to be too small and too slow. A major problem was that, because they had a single propeller shaft/engine combo, if either component failed, the U-boat became almost totally disabled. To rectify this flaw, the UB II boats featured twin propeller shafts and twin engines (one shaft for each engine), which also increased the U-boat's top speed. The new design also included more powerful batteries, larger torpedo tubes, and a deck gun. As a UB II boat, U-47 could also carry twice the torpedo load of her UB I counterparts, and nearly ten times as much fuel. To contain all of these changes the hull was larger, and the surface and submerged displacement was more than double that of the UB I boats.

The German Imperial Navy ordered UB-42 from AG Weser of Bremen on 31 July 1915 as one of a series of six UB II boats (numbered from UB-42 to ). She had a single hull with saddle tanks and had a draught of  when surfaced. She displaced  while submerged but only  on the surface.

The submarine was equipped with twin Daimler diesel engines and twin electric motors—for surfaced and submerged running, respectively—that drove one  propeller shaft.

UB-42 was equipped with two  bow torpedo tubes and could carry four torpedoes. The U-boat was also armed with one  Uk L/30 deck gun.

UB-42 was laid down on 3 September 1915. As one of six U-boats selected for service in the Mediterranean while under construction, UB-42 was broken into railcar-sized components and shipped overland to the Austro-Hungarian port of Pola. Shipyard workers from Weser assembled the boat and her five sisters at Pola, where she was launched on 4 March 1916.

Service career 
UB-42 was commissioned into the German Imperial Navy on 23 March 1916 under the command of Kapitänleutnant Fritz Wernicke. UB-42, Wernicke's first U-boat command, was assigned to the Navy's Pola Flotilla. Although the flotilla was based in Pola, the site of the main Austro-Hungarian Navy base, boats of the flotilla operated out of the Austro-Hungarian base at Cattaro which was located farther south and closer to the Mediterranean. German U-boats typically returned to Pola only for repairs. The first months of service for UB-42 proved unsuccessful; the U-boat sank no ships while in the Pola Flotilla.

After Germany's conquest of Southern Romania (see Romania during World War I), the German Imperial Navy had sufficient fuel oil for submarines located in the Black Sea. UB-42 and three of her sister ships in the Pola Flotilla were ordered to Constantinople and, en route, had to navigate through the Dardanelles, which had been heavily mined by the Allies in the middle of 1916. UB-42 joined the Constantinople Flotilla on 16 August.

The German submarines in the Black Sea accomplished little, sinking only six ships between August 1916 and the end of the year. UB-42 sank half of the six in September and October. On 3 September, Wernicke and UB-42 achieved their first success when they sank the Russian transport Peter Darcy in the Black Sea. The 731 GRT ship was headed from Constantza to Odessa when torpedoed by UB-42. On 30 September 1916, near the Romanian port of Sulina, UB-42 launched a torpedo at the Romanian torpedo boat Smeul, but missed. The Romanian warship counterattacked, damaging the submarine's periscope and conning tower and forcing her to retreat.

In April 1917, UB-42 was operating in the Mediterranean when she made attacks on four ships. On 1 April, Wernicke sank the 122 GRT Italian sailing vessel. Flora, north of Thilos. Two days later, UB-42 sank the 86 GRT Egyptian sailing ship off Gaza and, a week after that, sank a 15 GRT Italian sailing vessel, Boro, east of Rhodes in the Aegean Sea.

On 14 May, Wernicke was succeeded by Kapitänleutnant Kurt Schwarz as commander of UB-42. The 27-year-old Schwarz, who had previously commanded the Type UB I boat , led UB-42 to sink her largest ship, on 24 June. Three of Cestrians crewmen died in the attack and, according to R. H. Gibson and Maurice Prendergast, "splendid discipline" among the embarked troops was the sole reason that none were lost.

In early October, UB-42 had returned to the Black Sea, when she was ordered to deliver five Georgians with gold to finance a Georgian independence movement. While remaining in the Black Sea, UB-42 sank the sailing ships Agios Georgios on 10 October, and Francesco Patrino in November. On 22 November, she torpedoed the 1,086 GRT Siracusy while the latter was at anchor off the Georgian coast. UB-46 also shelled Tuapse while in the northern Black Sea.

Kapitänleutnant Erich von Rohrscheidt assumed command of UB-42 on 6 April 1918, and six week later, led the U-boat in capturing the motor sailing vessel Sergij as prize six weeks later off Novorossisk. In September, Kapitänleutnant Hans Georg Lübbe (who had succeeded Herbert Nolde after his two-month stint as commander of UB-42) led the U-boat in sinking her final ship. On the night of 7/8 September, the 1,833 GRT Italian steamer Vicenza was sent down south of Salonica. UB-42s commanding officer was changed twice more before the end of the war, but the submarine sank no more ships.

After the signing of the Armistice of Mudros on 30 October ended the war for the Ottoman Empire, the four remaining U-boats of the Constantinople Flotilla—UB-14, UB-42, and —fled to Sevastopol. There they were surrendered on 26 November. UB-42 was broken up at Malta in 1920.

Summary of raiding history

Notes

References

Bibliography 

 
 
 

 
 
 

 
 

German Type UB II submarines
U-boats commissioned in 1916
World War I submarines of Germany
1916 ships
Ships built in Bremen (state)